The Conqueror of the Orient (Italian:Il conquistatore dell'Oriente) is a 1960 Italian adventure film directed by Tanio Boccia and starring Gianna Maria Canale, Rik Battaglia and Irène Tunc. It is set several centuries ago in the Middle East, part of a group of Arabian Nights-inspired films made in Italy during the era. It was shot at the De Laurentiis Studios in Rome.

The plot centres around a lowly fisherman saving a Princess from the kingdom's oppressive rulers, then discovering that he is the true heir to the throne.

Cast
 Gianna Maria Canale as Dinazar / Zobeida  
 Rik Battaglia as Nadir  
 Irène Tunc as Fatima  
 Edda Ferronao as Fatima' Maid #1  
 Attilio Torelli as Leader of the Red Robes Tribe  
 Riccardo Ferri as Leader of the White Robes Tribe  
 Myriam Cordella as Fatima' Maid #2  
 Aldo Pini as Chief of Prison Guards  
 Renato Montalbano 
 Paul Muller as Sultan Dakar  
 Tatiana Farnese as Katiscia  
 Franco Balducci as Nureddin, Nadir's Companion  
 Giulio Donnini as Rato - the Chancellor  
 Fosco Giachetti as Omar, Nadir's Father

References

Bibliography 
 Howard Hughes. Cinema Italiano: The Complete Guide from Classics to Cult. I.B.Tauris, 2011.

External links 
 
 The Conqueror of the Orient at Variety Distribution

1960 films
1960 adventure films
Italian adventure films
1960s Italian-language films
Films directed by Tanio Boccia
Films shot in Rome
Films based on One Thousand and One Nights
1960s Italian films